Eileen E. Gillese is a justice of the Court of Appeal for Ontario. She is a graduate of the University of Alberta and Oxford University. Before her appointment to the Court of Appeal, Gillese was a judge of the Ontario Superior Court of Justice.

Before her judicial appointments, Gillese was Dean and Professor of Law of the Faculty of Law, the University of Western Ontario (1983-1999).
 
Gillese was appointed commissioner of the Public Inquiry into the Safety and Security of Residents in the Long-Term Care Homes System by the Government of Ontario on August 1, 2017. The inquiry was established to investigate the circumstances surrounding serial killer nurse Elizabeth Wettlaufer's crimes and gaps in legislative or policy frameworks that allowed Wettlaufer to continue working as a nurse even after other serious workplace problems became apparent.

Gillese served as the second chancellor of Brescia University College from 2015 until 2019.

References

Alumni of Wadham College, Oxford
Canadian Rhodes Scholars
Justices of the Court of Appeal for Ontario
People from Edmonton
University of Alberta alumni
Academic staff of the University of Western Ontario
Year of birth missing (living people)
Living people